Kyrönmaa is a subdivision of Ostrobothnia and a former sub-region of Finland. The sub-region was created in 2009 and abolished in 2021.

References

Geography of Ostrobothnia (region)
Former sub-regions of Finland